Belfiore is a comune  s in the province of Verona, Veneto, northern Italy.

References

Cities and towns in Veneto